The Cacova is a left tributary of the river Govora in Romania. It flows into the Govora in Stoenești.

References

Rivers of Romania
Rivers of Vâlcea County